The Lekoviti Show ("Healing Show"), is a Serbian sketch comedy and variety show talk show hosted by Dragoljub Mićko Ljubičić, in character as Dr Agoljub, on B92. The show premiered on March 31, 2015 and is produced by B92 and Tim Talenata. Each episode features a celebrity who acts like a patient with problems such as bribe-giving.

It is filmed at Prva TV Studios in Zemun, Serbia.

Every episode opens with Dr Agoljub's monologue. Second segment is a "hidden camera" in waiting room where guest talks to a man in a suit (portrayed by Dragoljub Mićko Ljubičić), who is resembling to Serbian prime minister Aleksandar Vučić. Third part is Dr Agoljub's talk with a patient of the evening.

Season 1

References

Serbian television talk shows
Television sketch shows
Variety television series
B92 original programming